The 2021 All Stars match  was the tenth annual representative exhibition All Stars match of Australian rugby league. The match was played between the Indigenous All Stars and the Māori All Stars at Townsville, Queensland's Queensland Country Bank Stadium on 20 February 2021.

Men's All Stars match

Teams 

1 - Wade Graham was originally selected to play but withdrew due to injury. Tyrell Fuimaono was be moved from the bench to second row and Graham was replaced by Zac Saddler.
2 - Kevin Proctor was originally selected to play but withdrew due to injury. He was replaced by Zane Musgrove.
3 - Josh Addo-Carr was originally selected to play but withdrew due to a Victoria COVID-19 border closure. Alex Johnston was moved from the bench to wing and Addo-Carr was replaced by Corey Thompson.
4 - Reimis Smith was originally selected to play but withdrew due to a Victoria COVID-19 border closure. Patrick Herbert was moved from the bench to wing and Reimis Smith was replaced by Esan Marsters.
5 - Jahrome Hughes was originally selected to play but withdrew due to a Victoria COVID-19 border closure. Benji Marshall was moved from the bench to halfback and Hughes was replaced by Daejarn Asi.
6 - Jesse Bromwich was originally selected to play but withdrew due to a Victoria COVID-19 border closure. He was replaced by Russell Packer.
7 - Brandon Smith was originally selected to play but withdrew due to a Victoria COVID-19 border closure. Jeremy Marshall-King was moved from the bench to hooker and Brandon Smith was replaced by Issac Luke.
8 - Kenny Bromwich was originally selected to play but withdrew due to a Victoria COVID-19 border closure. Jordan Riki was moved from the bench to second row and Kenny Bromwich was replaced by Jackson Topine.
9 - Nelson Asofa-Solomona was originally selected to play but withdrew due to a Victoria COVID-19 border closure. He was replaced by Emry Pere.
10 - Bailey Simonsson was originally selected to play but withdrew due to injury. He was replaced by Wiremu Greig.

Result

Women's All Stars match 

For the ninth time, a Women's All Stars match will be held on 20 February 2021.

Teams

Result

References

All Stars match
Rugby league in Queensland
NRL All Stars match
Sport in Townsville